The Hillside Strangler, later the Hillside Stranglers, is the media epithet for one, later discovered to be two, American serial killers who terrorized Los Angeles, California, between October 1977 and February 1978, with the nicknames originating from the fact that many of the victims' bodies were discovered in the hills surrounding the city. 

It was initially believed that only one person was responsible for the killings. The police, however, determined from the positions of the bodies that two criminals were working together, but withheld that information from the press. The perpetrators were eventually discovered to be cousins Kenneth Bianchi and Angelo Buono Jr., who were later convicted of kidnapping, raping, torturing and murdering 10 women and girls ranging in age from 12 to 28.

The Hillside Strangler murders began with the deaths of three sex workers who were found strangled and dumped naked on hillsides northeast of Los Angeles between October and early November 1977. It was not until the deaths of five young women who were not sex workers, but girls who had been abducted from middle-class neighborhoods, that the media attention and subsequent "Hillside Strangler" moniker came to prominence. 

There were two more deaths in December and February before the murders abruptly stopped. An extensive investigation proved fruitless until the arrest of Bianchi in January 1979 for the murder of two more young women in Washington and the subsequent linking of his past to the Strangler case. 

The most expensive trial in the history of the California legal system at that time followed, with Bianchi and Buono eventually being found guilty of those crimes and sentenced to life imprisonment.

Background

In January 1976, Kenneth Bianchi left Rochester, New York, and moved to Los Angeles, California, to live with his cousin Angelo Buono Jr. Buono provided a strong role model for the docile Bianchi. When Bianchi was short of money, Buono came up with the idea of getting some girls to work for them as prostitutes. Two teenage runaways, Sabra Hannan and Becky Spears, met Bianchi and Buono, and once under their control, were forced to prostitute themselves. Eventually, Spears happened to meet lawyer David Wood, who was appalled at her situation and arranged for her to escape from the city.

Encouraged by Spears' escape, Hannan ran away from Bianchi and Buono a short time later. With their pimping income gone, they decided to find more teenage girls. Impersonating police officers, they eventually found another young woman and installed her in the previous girl's bedroom. Also, they bought from a prostitute named Deborah Noble a supposed "trick list" with names of men who frequented prostitutes. Noble and her friend, Yolanda Washington, delivered the trick list to Buono in October 1977.

Murders

Yolanda Washington
Yolanda Washington happened to mention to Buono that she always worked on a certain stretch of Sunset Boulevard. When Bianchi and Buono found that Deborah Noble had deceived them about the list but were unable to find her, they decided to take out their rage on Washington. Her naked body was found on October 17, 1977, on a hillside near the Ventura Freeway, and Detective Frank Salerno of the Los Angeles Sheriff's Department was called to the scene. It was determined that the corpse was cleaned before being dumped; faint marks were visible around the neck, wrists and ankles where a rope had been used. The victim had also been raped.

Judith Miller
On November 1, 1977, police were called to Alta Terrace Drive in La Crescenta, a neighborhood 12 miles north of downtown Los Angeles, where the body of a teenage girl was found naked, face up on a parkway in a middle-class residential area. The homeowner had covered her with a tarp in the early morning hours to prevent the neighborhood children from viewing her on their way to school. Ligature marks were on her neck, wrists and ankles, indicating to police she was bound and strangled. The body had been dumped, indicating she was killed elsewhere.

Detective Salerno also found a small piece of light-colored fluff on her eyelid and saved it for the forensic experts. A coroner's report further detailed that she had been raped and sodomized. The girl, who was described as being "small and thin, weighing about 90 pounds and appearing to be about 16 years old", was eventually identified as 15-year-old Judith Lynn Miller, a former student of Hollywood High School, a runaway, and occasional sex worker. 

Miller was last seen alive on October 31, 1977, talking to a man driving a large two-tone sedan on Sunset Boulevard next to Carney's. The stranglers told her they were undercover police officers, handcuffed her, and took her to Buono's Auto Upholstery Shop at 703 E. Colorado St. in Glendale, where she was murdered.

Lissa Kastin
Five days later, on November 6, 1977, the nude body of another woman was discovered near the Chevy Chase Country Club in Glendale. Like Miller, she bore five-point (neck, wrists, and ankles) ligature marks, and of having been strangled and brutally raped, but not sodomized. The woman was identified as 21-year-old waitress Elissa Teresa "Lissa" Kastin, who was last seen leaving the restaurant where she worked the night before her body was discovered.

Kastin was also a professional dancer for the all-female dance troupe The L.A. Knockers, and, unlike the two previous victims, she was not a sex worker, drug user or runaway. The stranglers followed Kastin after she was seen driving home from work, pulled her over on the street she lived on, presented a fake police badge, and told her that they were detectives. They then handcuffed her and told her they needed to take her in for questioning.

Aborted abduction of Catharine Lorre Baker
At some point in early November 1977, the two men approached 24-year-old Catharine Lorre Baker, the daughter of actor Peter Lorre — famous for his role as a serial killer in Fritz Lang's film M — with the intent of abducting and killing her. However, when they found a picture of her sitting on her father's lap among her identification, they let her go without incident, fearing the murder of a celebrity's child may attract an unusually high amount of police and press attention. Lorre did not realize who the men were until they were arrested, at which point she recalled that two men flashing L.A. police badges had approached her in the past.

Dolores Cepeda and Sonja Johnson
On Sunday, November 13, 1977, two girls, 12-year-old Dolores Ann "Dolly" Cepeda and 14-year-old Sonja Marie Johnson, boarded an RTD bus in front of the Eagle Rock Plaza on Colorado Boulevard and headed home. The last time they were seen was getting off the bus on York Boulevard and North Avenue 46, and approaching a two-tone sedan that reportedly had two men inside. Their two corpses were discovered by a 9-year-old boy who was treasure-hunting in a trash heap on a hillside near Dodger Stadium on November 20, 1977. Both of the girls' bodies had already begun to decompose. It was determined that they had been strangled and raped.

Kristina Weckler
Earlier that same day, November 20, 1977, hikers found the naked body of 20-year-old Kristina Weckler, a quiet honors student at the Art Center College of Design described by Detective Bob Grogan of the Los Angeles Police Department as a "loving and serious young woman who should have had a bright future ahead of her", on a hillside between Glendale and Eagle Rock. When found by Grogan, ligature marks were on her wrists, ankles, and neck, and when he turned her over, bruises on her breasts were obvious and blood oozed from her rectum. Unlike the first three victims, there were two puncture marks on her arm, but no signs of the needle tracks that indicated a drug addict. It was later revealed that Weckler had been injected with Windex, a hard-surface cleaner.

Evelyn Jane King
On November 23, 1977, the badly decomposed body of 28-year-old Evelyn Jane King, an aspiring actress who had gone missing on November 9, was discovered in bushes near the Los Feliz Boulevard off-ramp of the Golden State Freeway. The severity of decomposition prevented determination as to whether she had been raped or tortured, but she had been strangled like the others. In response authorities created a task force — initially composed of 30 officers from the LAPD, the Sheriff's Department and the Glendale Police Department — to catch the predator now dubbed the "Hillside Strangler".

Lauren Wagner
On November 29, 1977, police found the body of 18-year-old Lauren Rae Wagner, a business student who lived with her parents in the San Fernando Valley, in the hills around Los Angeles's Mount Washington. She had ligature marks on her neck, ankles, and wrists. There were also burn marks on her hands indicating she was tortured. Lauren's parents had expected her to come home before midnight, and the next morning, when they found her car parked across the street with the door ajar, her father questioned the neighbors.

He found that the woman who lived in the house where Lauren's car had been parked saw her abduction. This woman stated that she saw two men: one was tall and young, the other one was older and shorter with bushy hair. She also stated that she heard Wagner cry out "You won't get away with this!" during her abduction.

Kimberly Martin
On December 14, 1977, the naked body of 17-year-old sex worker Kimberly Diane Martin, which also showed signs of torture, was found on a deserted lot near Los Angeles City Hall. Martin had previously joined a call girl agency because she feared exposing herself on the streets with the Strangler on the loose. The killers happened to place a call to her agency from a Hollywood Public Library pay phone, and she was the call girl who was dispatched. When the police investigated the apartment she had been dispatched to, they found it vacant and broken into.

Cindy Hudspeth
The body of the final Hillside Strangler victim was discovered in Los Angeles on February 17, 1978, when a helicopter pilot spotted an orange Datsun abandoned midway down a cliff on the Angeles Crest Highway. Police responded to the scene and discovered the nude body of the car's owner, 20-year-old Cindy Lee Hudspeth — a student and part-time waitress — in the trunk. Her corpse again showed ligature marks, and she had been raped and tortured. She had been strangled and her body placed in the trunk of her car, which was then pushed off the cliff.

Hudspeth's murder had initially been unplanned. Bianchi had arrived at Buono's upholstery shop at closing time on February 16 to discover Hudspeth in the company of Buono, discussing upholstery work she wished him to perform on her car. The two men had a private discussion, opting to make her their next victim.

Investigation and trial
In January 1979, after intensive investigation, police charged Bianchi and Buono with the crimes. Bianchi had fled to Bellingham, Washington, where he was soon arrested by Bellingham Police Department for raping and murdering two women he had lured to a home for a house-sitting job. Bianchi attempted to set up an insanity defense, claiming that he had dissociative identity disorder and that a personality separate from himself committed the murders. Court psychologists, notably Dr. Martin Orne, observed Bianchi and found that he was faking, so Bianchi agreed to plead guilty and testify against Buono in exchange for leniency.

At the conclusion of Buono's trial in 1983, Presiding Judge Ronald M. George, who later became Chief Justice of the California Supreme Court, stated during sentencing, "I would not have the slightest reluctance to impose the death penalty in this case were it within my power to do so. Ironically, although these two defendants utilized almost every form of legalized execution against their victims, the defendants have escaped any form of capital punishment." Bianchi is serving a life sentence at the Washington State Penitentiary in Walla Walla. Buono died of a heart attack on September 21, 2002, at Calipatria State Prison in California, where he was serving a life sentence.

Veronica Compton
In 1980, Bianchi began a relationship with Veronica Compton. During his trial, she testified for the defense. She was later convicted and imprisoned for attempting to strangle a woman she had lured to a motel in an attempt to have authorities believe that the Hillside Strangler was still on the loose and the wrong man was imprisoned. While incarcerated, Bianchi had smuggled a semen filled condom to her in the spine of a book to use to make it look like a rape/murder committed by the Hillside Strangler. She was released in 2003.

Media

Film adaptations

See also 

 Alphabet murders

 List of serial killers in the United States

References

Cited works and further reading

External links
 "'Hillside Strangler' dies in prison", CNN, September 22, 2002
 Crime Library's story on the Hillside Stranglers

1977 in California
1977 murders in the United States
1978 in California
1978 murders in the United States
American serial killers
American people convicted of child sexual abuse
Crimes in California
Criminal duos
Incidents of violence against women
Male serial killers
Murder in California
Rapes in the United States
Torture in the United States